Bot Soccer is a simulation video game released in 1996 for MS-DOS and Microsoft Windows. It was developed by CAPS Software AG and published by Expert Software. Bot Soccer is a futuristic version of soccer played with a "cybercan" instead of a ball.

Gameplay

Reception

References

External links 
 

1996 video games
DOS games
Video games developed in Germany
Windows games